Ali Abdollahzadeh (born August 17, 1996) is an Iranian football forward, who currently plays for Sanat Naft Abadan in the Persian Gulf Pro League.(in Persian)

Honours 
 Tractor
 Shohada Cup (1): 2017

References 

1996 births
Living people
Iranian footballers
Iran youth international footballers
Association football forwards
Sanat Naft Abadan F.C. players
Tractor S.C. players
People from Abadan, Iran
Sportspeople from Khuzestan province